Andre Ochoa (born January 27, 2002) is an American college soccer player who plays as a forward for the UCLA Bruins.

Career

Youth
Ochoa played the majority of his youth career in his native California, playing for the Irvine Strikers before joining the LA Galaxy youth system in 2018. In 2020, Ochoa made his professional debut with the club's USL Championship affiliate LA Galaxy II, appearing in a 4–0 defeat to the Phoenix Rising. However, Ochoa was registered as a member of the Galaxy's academy, allowing him to maintain his college eligibility.

College
In the fall of 2020, Ochoa began his collegiate career at San Diego State University. Scoring twice in 10 matches, he was named to the All-Pac-12 Second Team as a freshman. He played two seasons at San Diego State where he finished with 27 appearances and seven goals. Ahead of the 2022 NCAA Division I men's soccer season, Ochoa transferred to the University of California, Los Angeles. During his junior year, he made 19 appearances, scoring three goals.

Senior 
In 2020, Ochoa made one appearance in USL Championship for LA Galaxy II. In 2022, Ochoa made three appearances for New Mexico United U23, scoring four goals.

Career statistics

Club

References

External links
Andre Ochoa at US Soccer Development Academy
Andre Ochoa at SDSU Athletics

2002 births
Living people
LA Galaxy II players
UCLA Bruins men's soccer players
San Diego State Aztecs men's soccer players
USL Championship players
USL League Two players
American soccer players
Association football forwards
Soccer players from Anaheim, California